Moussa Kaboré (born 6 July 1982 in Kombissiri, Burkina Faso) is a Burkinabé football striker.

Kaboré was part of the Burkinabé U-17 World Championship team, which finished third place of its group in the first round of competition. In 2000–2001 he played for ASFA Yennenga in the Burkinabé Premier League.

In Germany, the striker played for LR Ahlen, 1. FC Bocholt and TuRU Düsseldorf. In 2006, Kaboré moved to Moroccan sports club Wydad Casablanca and two years later he joined KS Bylis Ballsh in the Albanian Superliga.

External links
 
 

1982 births
Living people
Burkinabé footballers
Burkinabé expatriate footballers
1. FC Bocholt players
ASFA Yennenga players
Santos FC Ouagadougou footballers
People from Centre-Sud Region
Association football forwards
21st-century Burkinabé people